Cities with significant Korean American populations represent municipalities with critical masses of Korean Americans in their total urban or suburban populations. Information is based on the 2005-2009 American Community Survey or as specified in each table. The list includes those who have emigrated from South Korea as well as Korean Americans of multiple generations. There are numbers of North Koreans living in the United States, despite North Korean citizens being unable to freely emigrate out of their country. As of 2009, Americans of Korean descent made up about 0.4% of the population, or 1,307,000 people.

The three metropolitan areas with the highest Korean American populations as per the 2009 American Community Survey were the Greater Los Angeles Combined Statistical Area (300,000), the Greater New York Combined Statistical Area (200,000), and the Washington-Baltimore Metropolitan Area (93,000). Southern California and the New York City Metropolitan Area have the largest populations of Koreans outside of the Korean Peninsula. Among Korean Americans born in Korea, the Los Angeles metropolitan area had 226,000 as of 2012; Greater New York (including Northern New Jersey) was home to 153,000 Korean-born Korean Americans; and metropolitan Washington, 60,000.

By percentage, the Korean American population of Bergen County, New Jersey, in the New York City Metropolitan Area, was 6.3% by the 2010 United States Census, the highest of any county in the United States. In 2010, Bergen County, host to the county's highly ranked Academies magnet public high school as well as to the North American headquarters operations of South Korean chaebols including Samsung, LG Corp, and Hanjin Shipping, was home to all of the nation's top ten municipalities by percentage of Korean population and an absolute total of 56,773 Korean Americans. The concentration of Korean Americans in Palisades Park, New Jersey, within Bergen County, was the highest of any municipality in the United States in 2010, at 52% of the population. The city of Los Angeles contained the highest Korean American population of any city proper in 2010, approximately 108,282.

Large cities
The list of large cities (population greater than 250,000) with a Korean-American population of at least 1% of the total population.

Medium-sized cities
List of medium-sized cities (population between 100,000 and 250,000) with a Korean-American population of at least 1% of the total population.

Municipalities with density of at least 500 Korean Americans per square mile in 2010
Main articles: Koreatown, Palisades Park (벼랑 공원 코리아타운) and Koreatown, Fort Lee (포트 리 코리아타운)

(Note that Manhattan and Queens are official boroughs of New York City.)

Top ten municipalities as ranked by Korean-American percentage of total population in 2010

See also
Koreatown
Koreatown, Manhattan
Koreatown, Long Island
Koreatown, Los Angeles, California
Koreatown, Palisades Park
Koreatown, Fort Lee
List of U.S. cities with Asian American majority populations
List of U.S. cities with significant Chinese American populations
History of the Korean Americans in Los Angeles
Korean Americans in New York City
Koreans in Chicago
Korean diaspora
Tech companies in the New York metropolitan area

References

Sources
 American Census U.S. Census website

Korean
American people of Korean descent
Korean-American history
Korean